is a passenger railway station located in the city of Miyoshi, Tokushima Prefecture, Japan. It is operated by JR Shikoku and has the station number "D27".

Lines
Shimanto limited express from Takamatsu to Kōchi, Nakamura, and Sukumo also stop at the station.

Layout
The station, which is unstaffed, consists of an island platform and a side platform serving three tracks. A building by the access road serves as a waiting room. From there, a pedestrian level crossing connects to the island platform and, across two more tracks, to the side platform.

Adjacent stations

History
At this time the station was named  and was operated by Japanese Government Railways, later becoming Japanese National Railways (JNR). On 1 October 1950, the station was renamed Ōboke Station. With the privatization of JNR on 1 April 1987, control of the station passed to JR Shikoku.

Passenger statistics
In fiscal 2019, the station was used by an average of 71 passengers daily

Surrounding area
Yoshino River - the second longest river in Shikoku. The track runs on the left bank and a scenic view of the river is available from the side platform.
National Route 32 - this main trunk route runs parallel to the track on the other side of the Yoshino River.
Ōboke Gorge - a scenic gorge on the Yoshino River. Boat excursions are available near the station.

Bus services
A bus stop for buses operated by the Shikoku Transportation Company is located near the front entrance of the station.

See also
 List of Railway Stations in Japan

References

External links

 JR Shikoku station home page

Railway stations in Tokushima Prefecture
Railway stations in Japan opened in 1935
Miyoshi, Tokushima